The 1982 Ole Miss Rebels football team represented the University of Mississippi during the 1982 NCAA Division I-A football season. The team failed to win a single SEC game.

Schedule

Roster

References

Ole Miss
Ole Miss Rebels football seasons
Ole Miss Rebels football